The Leicester University astronomical clock is a modern astronomical clock at the University of Leicester.

History and description

The clock was installed in 1989 on the side of the Rattray Lecture Theatre at the University of Leicester. It was designed and constructed by Allan Mills and Ralph Jefferson.

References

Individual clocks in England
Astronomical clocks in the United Kingdom
University of Leicester
Buildings and structures completed in 1989